Mountain Grove, also known as the Benjamin Harris House, is a historic home located near Esmont, Albemarle County, Virginia. The house was built in 1803–1804, and consists of a two-story, three-bay center block flanked by single-bay, -story wings, in the Jeffersonian style. The brick dwelling sits on a high basement and the center block is treated as a classical temple motif, is capped by a pedimented gable roof.  Also on the property are the brick ruins of a 19th-century kitchen.

It was added to the National Register of Historic Places in 1980.

References

External links

 Benjamin Harris House, State Route 717, Esmont, Albemarle County, VA at the Historic American Buildings Survey (HABS)

Houses on the National Register of Historic Places in Virginia
Palladian Revival architecture in Virginia
Houses completed in 1804
Houses in Albemarle County, Virginia
National Register of Historic Places in Albemarle County, Virginia
Historic American Buildings Survey in Virginia